Fritillaria rhodocanakis  is a species of plant in the lily family Liliaceae. In its pure form, it is found only on Hydra Island (also called Ydra or Hydrea or Ύδρα) and on small neighboring islands in Greece . Additional populations occur in the Peloponnisos region of mainland Greece, though the specimens there show some degree of hybridization with F. spetsiotica and F. graeca. In 1987, some of the hybrids were described with the name Fritillaria rhodocanakis subsp. argolica, but this is now generally referred to as Fritillaria × spetsiotica Kamari.

Fritillaria rhodocanakis is a bulb-forming herbaceous perennial. The flowers are nodding and pendent, each tepal purple with a yellow tip.

The species is listed as endangered by the IUCN. As of 2020, there were 500 mature individuals of the species with a stable conservation trend.

References

External links
Greek Flora in Greek, with several photos
Fritillaria Group, Alpine Garden Society, Fritillaria  species R-S photos of several species including Fritillaria rhodocanakis

rhodocanakis
Endemic flora of Greece
Plants described in 1878
Endangered plants